Wenjun Zeng, previously with the University of Missouri in Columbia, Missouri, was named Fellow of the Institute of Electrical and Electronics Engineers (IEEE) in 2012 "for contributions to multimedia communication and security".

Education
Ph.D., electrical engineering, Princeton University (1997).
Master of Science, electrical engineering, University of Notre Dame (1993).
Bachelor of Engineering, electronic engineering, Tsinghua University, Beijing, China (1990)

References 

Fellow Members of the IEEE
Living people
University of Missouri faculty
Chinese engineers
21st-century American engineers
Princeton University School of Engineering and Applied Science alumni
Year of birth missing (living people)